Josyane Savigneau  is a journalist and writer for  Le Monde, born on 14 July 1951 in Châtellerault, France.

Biography 
She became editor-in-chief of Le Monde des Livres, editorial subdivision of Le Monde (2005).

She has written 3 biographies:  Marguerite Yourcenar, Carson McCullers, and an auto-biography.

Bibliography
 Marguerite Yourcenar, l'invention d'une vie, Gallimard/Folio, 1993, 
 Carson McCullers, un cœur de jeune fille, Stock, 1995,  
 Juliette Gréco : hommage photographique, Actes Sud, 1998, 
 Un point de côté, Stock, 2008,

References 

1951 births
Living people
People from Châtellerault
French newspaper editors
French literary critics
Women literary critics
Women biographers
French women critics
20th-century French writers
French biographers
20th-century French journalists
21st-century French journalists